César Augusto Soares dos Reis Ribela (born 16 February 1995), simply known as César, is a Brazilian footballer who plays for Juventude as a goalkeeper.

Club career
Born in Uberaba, Minas Gerais, César played for hometown sides Independente AC and Triângulo Mineiro FC before moving to the Paraná state in 2012, after agreeing to a contract with Junior Team. In 2014, he signed a professional deal with Londrina, being initially assigned to the youth setup.

Promoted to the first team in 2015, César made his senior debut on 26 March 2017, starting in a 0–0 Campeonato Paranaense away draw against J. Malucelli. He subsequently became a regular starter during the season, appearing in 36 Série B matches and winning the 2017 Primeira Liga.

On 12 June 2018, César moved abroad and joined Portuguese LigaPro side Estoril, on a one-year loan deal. He returned to his parent club in June 2019, after featuring rarely, and was again a regular starter.

On 10 January 2020, César joined Coritiba on loan until December. After being a third-choice behind Wilson and Alex Muralha, he left the club and moved to Vitória on 12 March, also in a temporary deal.

Back to Londrina for the 2021 campaign, César played his 100th match for the club on 5 November of that year, in a 0–1 home loss against Cruzeiro. He left the club in December, after narrowly avoiding relegation.

On 17 December 2021, César agreed to a two-year deal with Série A side Juventude.

Career statistics

Honours
Londrina
Primeira Liga: 2017
Campeonato Paranaense: 2021

References

External links

1995 births
Living people
People from Uberaba
Brazilian footballers
Association football goalkeepers
Campeonato Brasileiro Série B players
Londrina Esporte Clube players
Coritiba Foot Ball Club players
Esporte Clube Vitória players
Liga Portugal 2 players
G.D. Estoril Praia players
Brazilian expatriate footballers
Brazilian expatriate sportspeople in Portugal
Expatriate footballers in Portugal
Sportspeople from Minas Gerais